Prosorhochmidae is a family of nemertean worms belonging to the suborder Monostilifera. It contains the following genera:
 Antiponemertes
 Arhochmus Maslakova & Norenburg, 2008
 Argonemertes
 Eonemertes Gibson, 1990
 Gononemertes Bergendal, 1900
 Geonemertes
 Prosadenoporus Bürger, 1890
 Prosorhochmus Keferstein, 1862

References

 
Monostilifera
Nemertea families